The New Jersey Devils are a professional ice hockey team based in Newark, New Jersey. The club was founded in Kansas City, Missouri, as the Kansas City Scouts in 1974, moved to Denver, Colorado, as the Colorado Rockies after only two seasons, and then settled in New Jersey in 1982. Since arriving in New Jersey, the Devils have drafted 329 players.

New Jersey's first draft pick was Rocky Trottier, taken eighth overall in the 1982 NHL Entry Draft. Eighteen picks would go on to play over 1,000 NHL games: Brendan Shanahan, Pat Verbeek, Kirk Muller, Ken Daneyko, Martin Brodeur, Scott Niedermayer, Brian Rolston, Patrik Elias, John MacLean, Bill Guerin, Eric Weinrich, Scott Gomez, Zach Parise, Travis Zajac, Brian Gionta, Petr Sykora, Steve Sullivan, and Jason Smith.

By nationality, the Devils have drafted 156 Canadians, 93 Americans, 26 Russians, 15 Swedes, 11 Finns, nine Czechs, six Slovaks, three Germans, one Briton, one Kazakh, one Latvian, one Pole, one Austrian, one Belarusian, and one Swiss. The Devils have drafted 12 players from the Oshawa Generals of the Ontario Hockey League (OHL), more than from any other team; the OHL also comprises the greatest number of draftees by league for the Devils, as 69 OHL players have been drafted. 184 forwards, 111 defensemen and 30 goaltenders have been drafted.

The Devils hosted the 2013 NHL Entry Draft at their home arena, the Prudential Center, in Newark, New Jersey. It was here where the Devils traded their first round selection, the ninth overall, to the Vancouver Canucks to acquire starting goaltender Cory Schneider. 

After winning the 2017 NHL Entry Draft lottery, the Devils selected Swiss center Nico Hischier with the team's first ever first overall pick. After winning the 2019 NHL Entry Draft lottery, the Devils selected American center Jack Hughes with the first overall pick.

Key

Draft picks

Statistics are complete as of the 2021–22 NHL season and show each player's career regular season totals in the NHL.  Wins, losses, ties, overtime losses and goals against average apply to goaltenders and are used only for players at that position. This list does not include players drafted by the Kansas City Scouts or the Colorado Rockies

See also
List of Kansas City Scouts draft picks
List of Colorado Rockies (NHL) draft picks
List of NHL first overall draft choices
List of undrafted NHL players with 100 games played

References
General

Draft history: 
Draft history: 
Player stats: 
Player stats: 

Specific

draft picks
New Jersey Devils